Vaulted sidewalks are sidewalks that are not placed directly on the ground. Rather, there is an empty space below them where the ground level used to be. This happens in cities where the street level has been raised over time.

Chicago 
The raising of Chicago started in 1855 as a response to the muddy conditions of the streets  and because of epidemics of cholera.  The raised streets needed new, raised sidewalks to match them.  In the case of vaulted sidewalks, which might be 5 feet (1.5 m) or more over the original street level, a structure was built to hold a new sidewalk at the new street level, and an empty space was left between the original and the new sidewalks.  This process gave building owners a choice: raise their buildings to the new street level, or relocate the main entrance to the second floor of the building to match the new street level.  Many buildings chose the latter option, opting to use the vaulted area for storage.  As recently as 2001 there were still over 2,000 vaulted sidewalks in Chicago

Today the old vaulted sidewalks are visible mostly during construction and cause increase costs of infrastructure maintenance.

Milwaukee 
, several sidewalk vaults, or "hollow walks," remain in Milwaukee's Historic Third Ward and increase the cost of street and sidewalk reconstruction.

New York
In New York, basements may extend beneath the sidewalk and drivers are warned "HOLLOW SIDEWALK, DO NOT PARK".

Seattle
Seattle Underground sidewalks have glass inlay to act as skylights for the lower level.

References 

Pavements
Sidewalks